Carolina Rodríguez Ferrero (born 15 July 1985), better known as Nina Rodríguez, is a Colombian pop singer-songwriter and model. She participated in the National Beauty Contest of Colombia, where she held the position of 1st princess (2nd finalist). In 2010 she won the contest for the international Top Model of The World, where she was appointed by the organization of the National Beauty Contest of Colombia.1

Rodriguez participated in representation of the department of Cundinamarca in the National Beauty Contest of Colombia in 2009, held in Cartagena de Indias, where she was crowned as 1st princess (2nd finalist) in 16 November 2009, after obtaining the qualifications 9.5 in parade in gala dress and 9.5 in parade in swimsuit.

In 2013, she began a solo career releasing an extended play "Búscame Un Doctor"  and her self-titled debut album "Nina Rodríguez" and its lead single also titled "Búscame Un Doctor". the same year she was selected as a participant for the second season of the Colombian version  of the singing competition TV series The Voice.

In 2014 Nina moved to Miami and released a single "Duelo".  In 2015 Nina released "Como Respirar", the lead single of her upcoming second studio album. In 2017 Nina released her second studio album "Heroína". 
 In 2020 she will release her third studio album "Ficciones Vol.1", which was followed by the release of several singles.

Discography

Studio albums

Extended plays

Singles

Music videos

References

Colombian pop singers
1985 births
Living people